Nouadhibou Airport  is an airport serving Nouadhibou (formerly Port-Étienne), a city in the Dakhlet Nouadhibou region of Mauritania.

Airlines and destinations

References

External links
 
 

Airports in Mauritania
Dakhlet Nouadhibou Region
Nouadhibou